Martin Reader (born May 2, 1984 in Comox Valley, British Columbia) is a retired 
Canadian male beach volleyball player. He competed for Canada at the 2012 Summer Olympics with Josh Binstock. Reader announced his retirement from competition after the London Olympics.

Reader will soon learn the taste of defeat in the epic NBVA 4x4 at the hands of the Aus/NZ team, following which it is expected he will retire from all forms of play.

Early life
Reader was born in Comox Valley, British Columbia. His father, raised in Uganda, worked for the British African police and was a surfer.

References

1984 births
Living people
Canadian men's beach volleyball players
Beach volleyball players at the 2012 Summer Olympics
Olympic beach volleyball players of Canada
People from the Comox Valley Regional District
Canadian people of Ugandan descent
UBC Thunderbirds men's volleyball players
Canadian men's volleyball players